Riedbach is a municipality in the district of Haßberge in Bavaria in Germany.

Riedbach may also refer to:

Riedbach (Bühler), a river of Baden-Württemberg, Germany, tributary of the Bühler
Riedbach (Kinzig), a river of Hesse, Germany, tributary of the Kinzig